Suto Choloievych Mamoian (born 2 December 1981) is a Ukrainian entrepreneur and politician. He is a People's Deputy of Ukraine in the 9th Ukrainian Verkhovna Rada.

Biography
In 2020 Mamoian lived in the village of Nalyvaykivka, in the Makariv district of Kyiv region. He is the founder of LLC "Mehapolis-Hrup", and the deputy director of the LLC "Miasprom".

Parliamentary activities
In the early parliamentary elections of 2019, he was a candidate for people's deputies from the political party "Opposition Platform — For Life", on general state multi-mandate constituency, Number 33 on the list. On 29 August 2019, he took the oath of People's Deputy of Ukraine.

He is a member of the Verkhovna Rada of Ukraine Committee on Law Enforcement and the Standing Delegation in the Parliamentary Dimension of the Central European Initiative.

Furthermore, Mamolan is the head of a group for inter-parliamentary relations with the Islamic Republic of Afghanistan and the co-chairman of a group for inter-parliamentary relations with the Republic of Iraq. He is member of the groups for inter-parliamentary relations with the United Arab Emirates, Armenia, the United States of America, the State of Israel and the United Kingdom of Great Britain and Northern Ireland.

References 

Living people
1981 births
Party of Regions politicians
Opposition Bloc politicians
Ninth convocation members of the Verkhovna Rada
Ukrainian businesspeople
People from Bucha, Kyiv Oblast